This list of University of Texas at Austin faculty includes current and former instructors and administrators of the University of Texas at Austin (UT Austin), a major research university located in Austin, Texas that is the flagship institution of the University of Texas System. Founded in 1883, the university has had the fifth largest single-campus enrollment in the nation as of Fall 2006 (and had the largest enrollment in the country from 1997 to 2003), with over 50,000 undergraduate and graduate students and 16,500 faculty and staff. It currently holds the largest enrollment of all colleges in the state of Texas.

Administration

School of Architecture

Moody College of Communication

College of Education

Cockrell School of Engineering

College of Fine Arts

School of Information

Jackson School of Geosciences

School of Law

College of Liberal Arts

Lyndon B. Johnson School of Public Affairs

McCombs School of Business

College of Natural Sciences 

 Yuval Ne'eman (1925–2006), Israeli physicist, politician, and President of Tel Aviv University

School of Nursing

College of Pharmacy

School of Social Work

To be inserted into tables above

Administration 
Eugene C. Barker — chairman, Department of History (Barker History Center)
Darlene Grant — Associate Dean of Graduate Studies
William Powers, Jr. — law professor, President of The University of Texas at Austin
Lawrence G. Sager — Dean, School of Law
James Steinberg — Dean, LBJ School of Public Affairs
Ben G. Streetman — Dean, Cockrell School of Engineering
Paul Woodruff — Dean of Undergraduate Studies

Arts and entertainment 
Chad Oliver — science fiction and Western writer
Ellen Spiro -  documentary filmmaker
Louis Alexander Waldman - art historian

Business

Education 
Marye Anne Fox — chemist, Chancellor of University of California, San Diego and formerly North Carolina State University
Robert L. Mills — educator; former president of Georgetown College, Kentucky

History, archive, and library science 
Eugene C. Barker — Texas historian, Chair of the History Department, academic journal editor
Nettie Lee Benson  historian, archivist, and the namesake of the Benson Latin American Collection
Walter L. Buenger  historian of the American South
Daina Ramey Berry  History Department Chair, historian specializing in gender, slavery, and black women
H. W. Brands  author, historian, Jack S. Blanton, Sr. Chair of history
Carlos Castañeda (historian)  historian, librarian, and archivist
Robert Cotner  historian, biographer of James Stephen Hogg
Toyin Falola  author and historian specializing in African studies
Joe Bertram Frantz  historian, biographer
George Pierce Garrison  one of the founding faculty members of the Department of History
A. G. Hopkins  professor emeritus, economic history
Madeline Y. Hsu  Asian-American and Chinese American history
Brian P. Levack  professor emeritus, early modern Europe
Philippa Levine  historian specializing in gender, race, and science; Walter Prescott Webb Professor of History and Ideas 
Steven Mintz  historian
Joan Neuberger  Russian and Soviet history
David Oshinsky  professor emeritus
Charles W. Ramsdell  historian
Jeremi Suri  historian, Mack Brown Distinguished Chair for Global Affairs
Ann Twinam  professor emeritus, historian, Colonial Latin America 
Walter Prescott Webb  historian of Texas and the American West

Journalism and publishing 
Gail Caldwell
J. Frank Dobie — American folklorist, writer, and columnist
Marvin Olasky  — journalist and conservative pundit

Law and government 
James K. Galbraith — head of the University of Texas Inequality Project at the LBJ School of Public Affairs
Barbara Jordan — the first black woman from a Southern state to serve in the U.S. House
Gretchen Ritter, professor of government at UT Austin from 1992 to 2013.
Oran Milo Roberts — Governor of Texas from January 21, 1879, to January 16, 1883
T. K. Seung — professor of philosophy, government, and law

Languages and literature
Américo Paredes  folklorist, novelist
J. Frank Dobie  folklorist, newspaper columnist

Philosophy 
Robert S. Boyer — professor of philosophy, computer science, and math
Jonathan Dancy — professor of philosophy
Robert Kane — professor of philosophy
Brian Leiter — professor of philosophy and law
Louis H. Mackey — professor of philosophy
Aloysius Martinich — professor of philosophy (world-renowned for his knowledge of Thomas Hobbes)
Mark Sainsbury — professor of philosophy
T. K. Seung — professor of philosophy, government, and law
Tara Smith — professor of philosophy
Robert C. Solomon — professor of philosophy
Paul Woodruff — professor of philosophy

Science and technology 
Eric J. Barron, former dean of College of Geosciences; current Director of National Center for Atmospheric Research
Adi Bulsara, PhD, 1978 (physics) - leading physicist in the area  of nonlinear dynamics
Franklin C. Crow — computer scientist
Bryce DeWitt — physicist, co-developed Wheeler-DeWitt equation ("wave function of the Universe")
Cécile DeWitt-Morette – mathematical physicist
Gordon Gunter — instructor in physiology (1939-1945), then researcher (1945-1949), acting director (1949-1954) and Director (1954-1955) of the University of Texas Institute of Marine Science at Port Aransas and editor of Publications of the Institute of Marine Science (1950-1955); influential fisheries scientist who pioneered the study of fisheries in the northern Gulf of Mexico
G.B. Halsted — mathematician
Clark Hubbs — ichthyologist
William H. Jefferys — astronomer
Zhimin Lu — biologist and oncologist 
Chris Mack — photolithographer
Hans Mark — aerospace engineer, former Deputy Administrator at NASA and Secretary of the Air Force
Thomas Harrison Montgomery, Jr. — zoologist
Hermann Joseph Muller — geneticist, Nobel Laureate in Physiology or Medicine
Ilya Prigogine — physicist and chemist, Nobel Laureate in Chemistry
Bill Schelter — mathematician, Lisp developer
Roy Schwitters — physicist, former director of the now-defunct Superconducting Super Collider
Elliot See — astronaut
Jonathan Sessler — chemist, pioneering work on expanded porphyrins
John Tate — mathematician, Wolf Prize in Mathematics
Harry Vandiver — mathematician
John Archibald Wheeler — physicist, Wolf Prize in Physics, coined the term 'black hole'
Robert E. Wyatt – chemist

Social sciences 
Walter Dean Burnham — political scientist
David Buss — evolutionary psychology
Mounira M. Charrad — political sociologist
Madonna Constantine — counseling psychologist
Scott Freeman — economist
James K. Galbraith — economist
Michael G. Hall - historian
Ian Hancock — linguist and Romani scholar
Milton W. Humphreys - first professor of Latin and Greek at UT Austin, 1883-1887
Thomas Pangle - professor of government
Linda Schele — expert in the field of Maya epigraphy and iconography
T. K. Seung — professor of philosophy, government, and law
Christen A. Smith — associate professor of anthropology
John Traphagan — anthropology
Philip L. White — professor of Colonial America and Nationality, 1955–2000; political activist and academic free-speech leader
Luis Zayas — professor of Psychiatry

See also 

 List of University of Texas at Austin presidents
 List of University of Texas at Austin alumni

References

External links
 UT Austin Faculty Directory

University of Texas at Austin faculty
University of Texas at Austin faculty